Maya Anne Ford (born January 8, 1979, in Oakland, California) is an American musician and the former bass player of rock band The Donnas. She also goes by the name Donna F.

Early life 

Maya Anne Ford, was born on January 8, 1979, in Oakland, California, on the same day as her former band member Torry Castellano. She met future bandmates Torry Castellano, Brett Anderson and Allison Robertson in junior high school. They formed a band in 8th grade called Ragady Anne, later calling themselves The Electrocutes at Palo Alto High School. Ford started to play the bass guitar at age 13. Initially she was playing guitar (she received an acoustic guitar from her cousin), but then she decided to switch to the bass. When her band (then known as Screen) started in May 1993, she had had approximately six months of playing experience.

References

External links
 The Donnas' official website (archived from 2013)
 Maya Ford gets cast for a Keep a Breast exhibition
 

1979 births
American rock bass guitarists
The Donnas members
Women bass guitarists
Living people
Musicians from Oakland, California
Musicians from Palo Alto, California
Guitarists from California
21st-century American women musicians
21st-century American bass guitarists
20th-century American bass guitarists
20th-century American women musicians